is a passenger railway station located in the city of Sayama, Saitama, Japan, operated by the private railway operator Seibu Railway.

Lines

Station layout
The station consists of two ground-level side platforms serving two tracks, connected to the station building by a footbridge.

Platforms

History
The station opened on 1 April 1933.

Station numbering was introduced on all Seibu Railway lines during fiscal 2012, with Inariyama-kōen Station becoming "SI22".

Passenger statistics
In fiscal 2019, the station was the 69th busiest on the Seibu network with an average of 10,053 passengers daily. 

The passenger figures for previous years are as shown below.

Surrounding area

North exit
 Iruma Air Base
 
 Sayama Hospital

South exit
 Tokyo Kasei University Sayama Campus
 Sainomori Iruma Park

References

External links

 Inariyama-kōen Station information (Seibu Railway) 

Railway stations in Saitama Prefecture
Railway stations in Japan opened in 1933
Seibu Ikebukuro Line
Sayama